Of the 5 West Virginia incumbents, 4 were re-elected and 1 lost renomination in a redistricting contest.

See also 
 List of United States representatives from West Virginia
 United States House of Representatives elections, 1972

1972
West Virginia
1972 West Virginia elections